John Snyder (January 29, 1793 – August 15, 1850) was a Democratic member of the U.S. House of Representatives from Pennsylvania.

John Snyder was born in Selinsgrove, Pennsylvania.  He served in the War of 1812 as captain of Selinsgrove Rifle Volunteers of the Pennsylvania Militia.  He was connected with the Snyder Spring Oil Company and paper mills.

Snyder was elected as a Democrat to the Twenty-seventh Congress.  He was an unsuccessful candidate for reelection in 1842.  He died in Selinsgrove in 1850.  Interment in the New Lutheran Cemetery.

Sources

1793 births
1850 deaths
People from Pennsylvania in the War of 1812
American Lutherans
Democratic Party members of the United States House of Representatives from Pennsylvania
Burials in Pennsylvania
19th-century American politicians
People from Selinsgrove, Pennsylvania
19th-century Lutherans